Pierluigi Gatti (born 29 March 1938) is a former Italian triple jumper who competed at the 1960 Summer Olympics.

References

External links
 

1938 births
Living people
Athletes (track and field) at the 1960 Summer Olympics
Italian male long jumpers
Italian male triple jumpers
Olympic athletes of Italy
Sportspeople from the Province of Imperia
People from Imperia